Kaniet may be,

Kaniet Islands, Papua New Guinea
Kaniet language spoken on the islands